The Pipistrel Spider is a Slovenian ultralight trike, designed and produced by Pipistrel of Ajdovščina. The aircraft is supplied as a kit for amateur construction or as a complete ready-to-fly-aircraft.

The Spider was sold in Europe by Flight Team UG & Company AG of Ippesheim, Germany and was sometimes called the Flight Team Spider.

By October 2018 it was listed as a "legacy" product and production had ended.

Design and development
It features a cable-braced hang glider-style high-wing, weight-shift controls, a two-seats-in-tandem open cockpit with an optional cockpit fairing, tricycle landing gear with wheel pants and a single engine in pusher configuration.

The aircraft is made from composites and steel tubing, with its double surface wing covered in Dacron sailcloth. A number of different wings can be fitted to the basic carriage, but typical is a  span wing is supported by a single tube-type kingpost and uses an "A" frame weight-shift control bar. The powerplant is a twin cylinder, air-cooled, two-stroke, dual-ignition  Rotax 503 or the twin cylinder, liquid-cooled, two-stroke, dual-ignition  Rotax 582 engine.

The manufacturer estimates the construction time from the supplied kit as 150 hours.

Operational history
By 1998 the company reported that 250 kits had been sold were flying.

Specifications (Spider)

References

External links
Official website archive page on archive.org
Official Spider photo gallery archive

1980s Yugoslav sport aircraft
1980s Yugoslav ultralight aircraft
Homebuilt aircraft
Single-engined pusher aircraft
Ultralight trikes